The next Romanian legislative elections must be held at the latest before 21 March 2025 (highly likely at some point during late 2024), that is three months after the term of the incumbent legislature of the Romanian Parliament (i.e. LVI) expires.

The forthcoming Romanian legislative elections are most likely going to take place in either November or December 2024, along with the presidential election of that year. If that will be the case, it will be for the first time in Romania since the 2004 general election, that the local, legislative, and presidential elections alike will all be held during the same year, thereby creating the premise for a resurgence of the general election in Romania.

Nevertheless, a snap election may be called by the still incumbent President, more specifically Klaus Iohannis, in accordance with the constitutional provisions (i.e. after the dissolution of the current legislature of the incumbent parliament) even considerably earlier than to term in late 2024.

Background 

Following the previous elections in December 2020, the Cîțu Cabinet was appointed, backed by a centre-right coalition of three Romanian political parliamentary parties as follows: the conservative liberal National Liberal Party (PNL), the progressive liberal/neoliberal USR PLUS (which subsequently switched back to the old USR acronym in late 2021), and the Hungarian minority-oriented Democratic Alliance of Hungarians in Romania (UDMR/RMDSZ).

In Romania, the President also plays an active role in politics, in spite of the constitutional prerogatives which held that he should act as an arbiter and/or mediator instead. Following the December 2019 presidential election, Klaus Iohannis of the National Liberal Party (PNL) was re-elected for another five years. Nonetheless, he is not eligible for a third consecutive term in 2024 or any longer in the future for that matter.

Both legislative and presidential terms will end in late 2024. Hence, both election types could be held on the same days, which would be the first time for such an electoral concatenation in Romania since the 2004 general election.

Organization 

On 18 December 2019, the head of the AEP stated that internet voting would be implemented for the 2024 electoral year.

Events

Governmental crisis (September–November 2021) 

The Cîțu cabinet, which took office on 23 December 2020, comprised two conservative liberal parties, namely the PNL and the UDMR/RMDSZ as well as the progressive liberal USR PLUS (which, after its latest congress held in early October 2021, returned to its initial official denomination, more specifically USR).

In September 2021, a major rift within the coalition led to the onset of the 2021 Romanian political crisis. Prime Minister Cîțu, with the unconditional support of President Klaus Iohannis, sacked Justice minister Stelian Ion. All the other USR ministers withdrew from government by 7 September 2021, which left the Cîțu cabinet in minority (with the limited support of PNL and UDMR/RMDSZ). Subsequently, two motions of no-confidence were filed, one by USR PLUS and the extremist-populist AUR and the second by the Social Democratic Party (PSD) with the three parties holding together a majority of seats needed for the dismissal of Prime Minister Cîțu and his minority cabinet.

Furthermore, Florin Cîțu was contested within the PNL but, in counterpart, received full support of President Iohannis, as he also sought to obtain the PNL leadership from previous PNL president Ludovic Orban. On 25 September 2021, Cîțu defeated Orban in the leadership vote of the PNL Congress. USR PLUS also held a leadership vote where Dacian Cioloș was elected new party president with 50.9% of the votes over Dan Barna, and the party's name switched to USR again. In addition, the party line was still to remove Cîțu as Prime Minister.

On 4 October 2021, Cîțu stated that any collaboration with USR was now impossible. According to the incumbent USR Mayor of Brașov, Allen Coliban, Cîțu's minority government held thanks for its limited existence only to the PSD. Nevertheless, on 5 October, the PSD motion of no-confidence was put to a vote, and won a large majority of 281, corresponding to PSD, USR, and AUR. Cîțu continued to serve as acting Prime Minister until the next government, more specifically the Ciucă cabinet, was sworn in on 25 November.

New political parties 

On 19 September 2021, former PSD president Liviu Dragnea, along with former and current ally Codrin Ștefănescu, launched the Alliance for the Homeland (ApP), a split-off from PSD and an alternative to it according to both.

On 3 October 2021, former PNL Prime Minister Ludovic Orban, who had just been defeated for the leadership of the PNL by Florin Cîțu at the 2021 party congress, stated that he is willing "to create a new political construction which would be ready to continue PNL's legacy". In this regard, at that time it was thought that he could be following the steps of Călin Popescu-Tăriceanu, another former national liberal Prime Minister who left PNL in order to establish his own political party, more specifically ALDE (which was subsequently absorbed by the PNL during late March 2022).

In addition, before further concrete steps on behalf of Orban, various commentators stated that Orban's faction could part ways with the main PNL should he not be designated PM after Cîțu's dismissal by the Parliament (which also occurred in the meantime). Subsequently, after PNL started negotiations with the PSD, more and more MPs resigned from the PNL and joined Orban's faction in the Parliament. Orban's new party was officially registered in December 2021 and is called "Force of the Right" (or FD for short).

Former PSD president and Prime Minister Viorica Dăncilă has, in the meantime, become president of the Nation People Together (NOI) party.

Former independent/technocratic Prime Minister and PLUS/USR PLUS/USR member (as well as former USR president) Dacian Cioloș officially quit the USR on 31 May 2022 to form a brand new party called REPER. Several MEPs (more specifically 4) who have been previously elected on the lists of the 2020 USR PLUS Alliance at the 2019 European Parliament election in Romania have sided with Dacian Cioloș for his newly established political project, but still remain affiliated with the Renew group in the European Parliament. REPER can thus be considered a splinter of USR.

The Green Party was also relaunched under the new name of the Green Party (Greens). The party is led by two co-presidents Marius Lazar and Lavinia Cosma. The party first appeared in the polls at the beginning of 2023.

New political alliances 

In May 2022, the Christian Democratic National Peasants' Party (PNȚCD) announced that it will prepare a new political alliance with the Alliance for the Homeland (ApP, formerly known under the acronym PAINE) for the forthcoming Romanian legislative elections scheduled to take place in late 2024. The two parties will allegedly form a "sovereignist" block which will oppose the National Coalition for Romania (CNR). In late August however, Liviu Dragnea, strongly associated in the past with the party at an unofficial level, has decided to indefinitely distance himself from the ApP.

Political groups

Electoral system 

The 330 members of the Chamber of Deputies are elected by several methods: 308 are elected from 42 multi-member constituencies based on counties and Bucharest, using proportional representation, four are elected using proportional representation from a constituency representing Romanians living abroad. Parties must pass a threshold of 5% of the national vote or at least 20% of the vote in four constituencies. Further seats (currently 18) can be added for ethnic minority groups that compete in the elections and pass a special (lower) threshold (calculated as 10% of the votes needed to obtain one of the regular 312 seats).

The 136 members of the Senate are also elected using party-list proportional representation, but from 43 constituencies based on the 41 counties (a total of 121 seats), Bucharest (13 seats), and one for Romanians living abroad (two seats).

Opinion polls 

The graphic below details the current overall voting intention for the forthcoming 2024 Romanian legislative elections, as of March 2023:

See also 

 Elections in Romania
 Parliament of Romania
 List of political parties in Romania
 Politics of Romania

Notes

References 

Romania
2025